Pomona is an unincorporated community and census-designated place (CDP) in Howell County, Missouri, United States. It is located midway between Willow Springs and West Plains. As of the 2010 census, Pomona had a population of 511.

A post office called Pomona has been in operation since 1895. The community was named for Pomona, the Roman goddess of fruit trees; this area was a major producer of apples.

Demographics

References

Census-designated places in Howell County, Missouri
Populated places established in 1895
Census-designated places in Missouri
1895 establishments in Missouri